Federal elections were held in Switzerland on 31 October 1869. The Radical Left remained the largest group in the National Council.

Electoral system
The 128 members of the National Council were elected in 47 single- and multi-member constituencies; there was one seat for every 20,000 citizens, with seats allocated to cantons in proportion to their population. The elections were held using a three-round system; candidates had to receive a majority in the first or second round to be elected; if it went to a third round, only a plurality was required. Voters could cast as many votes as there were seats in their constituency. In six cantons (Appenzell Innerrhoden, Appenzell Ausserrhoden, Glarus, Nidwalden, Obwalden and Uri), National Council members were elected by the Landsgemeinde.

Results

National Council 
Voter turnout was highest in Aargau at 85.6% (higher than the 79.1% who voted in Schaffhausen, where voting was compulsory) and lowest in Schwyz and Zug at 22.1%.

By constituency

Council of States

References

1869
1869 elections in Europe
1869 in Switzerland